The North Bondi Surf Life Saving Club is a foundation member of the surf lifesaving movement in Australia. It was founded in 1907 by a group of concerned locals and has a proud history of no lives being lost whilst its members have patrolled.

See also

Bondi Beach Cultural Landscape
Surf lifesaving
Surf Life Saving Australia
List of Australian surf lifesaving clubs

References

External links
 
 
 

1906 establishments in Australia
Sports clubs established in 1906
Surf Life Saving Australia clubs
Sporting clubs in Sydney
North Bondi, New South Wales